The 1920 Kalamazoo football team represented Kalamazoo College during the 1920 college football season.

Schedule

References

Kalamazoo
Kalamazoo Hornets football seasons
Kalamazoo football